2-Nonanol is a simple alcohol. It has the odor of cucumber, and has been identified in oysters. It is used by several insects as pheromones. It is commercially available.

References

Nonanols